James Clough Gist III (born October 26, 1986) is an American professional basketball player for Bahçeşehir Koleji of the Basketbol Süper Ligi (BSL) and Basketball Champions League. Born in Adana, Turkey, he played high school basketball for Our Lady of Good Counsel, before enrolling to the University of Maryland to play college basketball for the Terrapins, from 2004 to 2008. Gist was considered for a time one of the best forward-centers in Europe, due to his defensive abilities and for his dunks, alley-oops, and his athleticism.

High school career
Gist attended Our Lady of Good Counsel High School. In his senior season, he averaged 19.5 points per game, to go along with 10.3 rebounds and 3.5 blocks per game, while he also became his school's all-time leader in blocked shots, with over 300.

College career
Gist played college basketball at the University of Maryland, where he played with the Maryland Terrapins. Gist scored a career-high 31 points against Wake Forest. Throughout the course of 4 NCAA Division I seasons, Gist appeared in 130 games for Maryland, averaging 10.9 points per game, 6.0 rebounds per game, and 1.8 blocks per game. At the time of his graduation, Gist was fourth all-time in blocked shots for Maryland, with 231, tenth in rebounds, with 783, and seventeenth in points scored, with 1,414 (later surpassed by Greivis Vásquez).

Professional career
Gist was drafted 57th overall, in the 2008 NBA draft, by the San Antonio Spurs. After spending a year with the Italian League club Biella, Gist signed a contract with the Russian team Lokomotiv-Kuban for the 2009–10 season. Gist played for the Spurs in the 2010 NBA Summer League, but was waived on October 19, 2010.

Then he played with Partizan Belgrade during the 2010–11 season, where he won the Basketball League of Serbia championship, the Radivoj Korać Cup, and the Adriatic League championship. In the summer of 2011, he signed a contract with the Turkish League club Fenerbahçe Ülker. Shortly afterwards, it was announced that he had a sample that tested positive for cannabis use, while playing for Partizan. On July 7, 2012, Fenerbahçe announced that Gist would not play the next season with the club.

On August 15, 2012, Gist signed one-year deal (with an option for one more season) with the Spanish League club Unicaja Málaga. On September 26, he won the slam dunk contest of the Spanish League. Gist joined the Greek League club Panathinaikos, in December 2012, as part of a trade with Andy Panko. At the end of the season, Gist renewed his contract with Panathinaikos for two additional seasons.

On March 17, 2015, Panathinaikos announced that they had agreed to terms with Gist to renew his contract for an extra two years, keeping him in Athens until 2017.

On April 5, 2015, Gist again tested positive for cannabis use, for the second time in his career, after the Greek Cup final against Apollon Patras. Eventually, on May 12, Gist was suspended for 8 months from participating in sports events. In the end, his suspension was reduced to 6 months, and Gist was allowed to play normally, from the beginning of the season. On October 22, 2015, while competing with Panathinaikos in a EuroLeague 2015–16 season game against Karşıyaka, Gist made a new personal EuroLeague career single-game scoring high, with 27 points scored.

On July 5, 2017, Gist signed a two-year contract extension with Panathinaikos.

On July 8, 2019, Gist signed a two-year contract with Serbian team Crvena zvezda. He averaged 7.0 points, 4.4 rebounds and 1.3 assists per game.

On December 3, 2020, he signed with Bayern Munich of the Basketball Bundesliga.

On September 25, 2021, he has signed with ASVEL of the LNB Pro A. The contract was extended to the end of the season on December 15.

On November 4, 2022, he signed with Bahçeşehir Koleji of the Basketbol Süper Ligi (BSL).

Personal life
Gist is the son of Linda and James C. Gist, Jr., and was born in İncirlik, Adana, Turkey, on 26 October 1986, when his father was in the US Air Force, and stationed at İncirlik Air Base. He was the first American child who was born at İncirlik Air Base.

Career statistics

EuroLeague

|-	
| style="text-align:left;"| 2010–11 	
| style="text-align:left;"| Partizan	
| 14 || 9 || 29.9 || .384 || .467 || .681 || 6.9 || 1.6 || 1.0 || 1.0 || 11.4 || 11.8
|-
| style="text-align:left;"| 2011–12	
| style="text-align:left;"| Fenerbahçe	
| 16 || 16 || 25.1 || .479 || .321 || .769 || 4.5 || .9 || 1.3 || .9 || 7.4 || 8.8
|-
| style="text-align:left;"| 2012–13	
| style="text-align:left;"| Unicaja / Panathinaikos	
| 29 || 14 || 22.2 || .426 || .347 || .587 || 4.5 || .6 || .7 || .7 || 8.1 || 8.1
|-
| style="text-align:left;"| 2013–14	
| style="text-align:left;"| Panathinaikos	
| 26 || 17 || 23.4 || .530 || .342 || .629 || 3.6 || .8 || 1.1 || .7 || 8.9 || 9.5
|-
| style="text-align:left;"| 2014–15	
| style="text-align:left;"| Panathinaikos	
| 28 || 17 || 23.0 || .456 || .319 || .731 || 4.3 || 1.5 || 1.0 || .6 || 9.5 || 10.5
|-
| style="text-align:left;"| 2015–16	
| style="text-align:left;"| Panathinaikos	
| 26 || 26 || 26.3 || .535 || .345 || .565 || 4.6 || 1.5 || 1.0 || .6 || 10.9 || 11.4	
|-
| style="text-align:left;"| 2016–17	
| style="text-align:left;"| Panathinaikos	
| 15 || 14 || 22.5 || .536 || .167 || .633 || 4.3 || .8 || 1.1 || .5 || 8.5 || 8.9
|-
| style="text-align:left;"| 2017–18	
| style="text-align:left;"| Panathinaikos	
| 34 || 28 || 25.2 || .546 || .250 || .674 || 4.4 || 1.0 || .8 || .4 || 9.8 || 10.5	
|-
| style="text-align:left;"| 2018–19	
| style="text-align:left;"| Panathinaikos	
| 33 || 14 || 20.8 || .534 || .391 || .706 || 3.5 || 1.2 || .6 || .4 || 7.8 || 9.1
|-
| style="text-align:left;"| 2019–20	
| style="text-align:left;"| Crvena zvezda	
| 25 || 7 || 20.3 || .417 || .211 || .593 || 4.4 || 1.3 || .7 || .4 || 7.0 || 6.7
|-
| style="text-align:left;"| 2020–21	
| style="text-align:left;"| Bayern Munich	
| 23 || 12 || 21.6 || .444 || .167 || .638 || 3.0 || .7 || .7 || .3 || 5.6 || 4.2
|- class="sortbottom"
| style="text-align:left;"| Career
| style="text-align:left;"|
| 269 || 174 || 23.4 || .485 || .326 || .653 || 4.2 || 1.1 || .9 || .6 || 8.6 || 9.0

References

External links

 James Gist at acb.com 
 James Gist at eurobasket.com
 James Gist at esake.gr 
 James Gist at esake.gr 
 James Gist at euroleague.net
 James Gist at legabasket.it 
 James Gist at tblstat.net

1986 births
Living people
20th-century African-American people
21st-century African-American sportspeople
ABA League players
African-American basketball players
American expatriate basketball people in Greece
American expatriate basketball people in Italy
American expatriate basketball people in Russia
American expatriate basketball people in Serbia
American expatriate basketball people in Spain
American expatriate basketball people in Turkey
American men's basketball players
ASVEL Basket players
Bahçeşehir Koleji S.K. players
Baloncesto Málaga players
Basketball players at the 2007 Pan American Games
Basketball players from Maryland
Centers (basketball)
Fenerbahçe men's basketball players
KK Partizan players
Liga ACB players
Maryland Terrapins men's basketball players
Pallacanestro Biella players
Pan American Games competitors for the United States
Panathinaikos B.C. players
PBC Lokomotiv-Kuban players
People from Silver Spring, Maryland
People from Wheaton, Maryland
Power forwards (basketball)
San Antonio Spurs draft picks
Sportspeople from Adana
Turkish expatriate basketball people in Serbia
Turkish people of African-American descent